Alonso Espeleta (born Alonso Espeleta Corral on July 26, 1988, in Durango) is a Mexican actor. He's best known for the role of "Luis Mercenario" in Telemundo's telenovela, Pecados Ajenos.

TV shows 
 Rosario Tijeras (2016 telenovela) – Chavez
 El Dandy (TV series) (2015) – Huesos
 Amor Cautivo (2012) – Diego del Valle
 Cielo Rojo (2011) – Andres Renteria – Young Andres
 Secretos del Alma (2008–2009) – Nico
 Pecados Ajenos (2007–2008) – Luis Mercenario

References 

1988 births
Living people
Mexican male actors
Male actors from Durango
Mexican expatriates in the United States
People educated at Centro de Estudios y Formación Actoral